The 2022–23 Iraq Division One is the 49th season of the Iraq Division One, the second tier of the Iraqi football league system since its establishment in 1974. The number of clubs in the league have varied throughout history for various reasons. The top two teams are promoted to the Iraqi Premier League, while the bottom 3 teams in each group are directly relegated to the Iraq Division Two.

Team changes 
The following teams have changed division since the 2021–22 season:

To Iraq Division One 

 Promoted from Division Two 
 Al-Etisalat
 Al-Hawija
 Al-Jolan
 Masafi Al-Wasat

 Relegated from the Premier League 
 Amanat Baghdad
 Al-Minaa
 Samarra

From Iraq Division One 

 Promoted to the Premier League 
 Al-Hudood
 Duhok
 Karbalaa

 Relegated to Division Two 
 Al-Alam
 Babil
 Ghaz Al-Shamal
 Suq Al-Shuyukh

Overview

Changes 
In November 2020, The Iraq FA announced that the number of teams will decrease from 28 to 24 in total starting from 2021-2022 season. To make these changes possible, the Iraq FA announced that in 2022–23 season, a two teams are promoted to the Premier League, where the winner and runner-up of each group will play a play-off match, so that the winners will be promoted directly to the Premier League, while 6 teams in total are directly relegated to Division Two.

Developments
On December 27, 2022, the Iraq Football Association decided to stop the championship matches, starting from the ninth round, due to the holding of the Arabian Gulf Cup in Iraq, and decided that the championship would resume after the end of the Arabian Gulf Cup. Indeed, the ninth round of the championship resumed on January 18, 2023.

Teams 
A total of 24 teams are contesting the league, including 17 sides from the 2021–22 season and the 3 relegated sides from the Iraqi Premier League and the 4 promoted sides from the Iraq Division Two, because of the recent changes necessary to adjustment to having 24 teams possible this season. The teams were divided into two groups, and the draw was held on October 27, 2022, and it was decided that the championship will start on November 18, 2022.

2022–23 season

Managerial changes

League table

Group 1

Results

Group 2

Results

Play-offs
The two winning teams are promoted directly to the Iraqi Premier League

|}

Third place

Final

Promotion play-off
The 18th-placed team in the Premier League will face the 3rd-placed team in the Division One in a play-off match for a place in next season's Premier League.

Season statistics

Top scorers

Hat-tricks

Notes
(H) – Home team(A) – Away team

References

External links
 Iraq Football Association
 Iraqi First Division League 2022/2023 

Iraq Division One seasons
2022–23 in Iraqi football